Caitrin Rogers is an American documentary film producer. She is best known for producing 20 Feet from Stardom (2013), which earned her an Academy Award, an Independent Spirit Award, and a Grammy Award.

Early life and education
Rogers was born in Pittsfield, Massachusetts to Suzanne Nichols and John Rogers. She graduated from Northfield Mount Hermon School in 2000 and Occidental College in 2004.

Career
Rogers began her film career as an editor a few years after graduation, moving to Los Angeles and working for a variety of companies such as MTV, VH1, BET and Disney.

She subsequently worked as an assistant editor on the films Once in a Lifetime: The Extraordinary Story of the New York Cosmos (2006) and Amazing Journey: The Story of The Who (2007).

In 2007, she began working for Passion Pictures as a producer on the film The Tillman Story (2010).

In 2014, she won an Academy Award for the film 20 Feet from Stardom (2013), which received excellent reviews, with the website Rotten Tomatoes giving it a 99% approval rating.

She also produced the miniseries Ugly Delicious (2018) and Shangri-La (2019), as well as the films The Black Godfather (2019) and Miss Americana (2020).

Awards and nominations

References

External links
 

Living people
American documentary film producers
Film producers from Massachusetts
Producers of Best Documentary Feature Academy Award winners
People from Pittsfield, Massachusetts
Northfield Mount Hermon School alumni
Occidental College alumni
Year of birth missing (living people)
21st-century American women
American women documentary filmmakers